Afsar Bayram oghlu Javanshirov (November 8, 1930 — May 20, 2006) was an Azerbaijani composer, Honored Art Worker of the Azerbaijan SSR.

Biography 
Afsar Javanshirov was born on November 8, 1930, in the Horadiz village. In 1948, he graduated from high school and children's music school No. 2. He graduated from the Baku Music College in 1952. In the same year he was admitted to the composition faculty of the Hajibeyov Azerbaijan State Conservatoire, in 1958 he graduated from the class of Professor Jovdat Hajiyev.

He was the art director of the "Bənövşə" children's choir and dance ensemble of the Azerbaijan State Television and Radio Broadcasting Company. He is the author of 7 symphonies for the Great Symphony Orchestra, poems, works for the a cappella choir, works for the children's choir, etc.

Afsar Javanshirov died on May 20, 2006, in Baku.

Awards 
 Honored Art Worker of the Azerbaijan SSR — December 1, 1982
 Honorary Decree of the Supreme Soviet of the Azerbaijan SSR — May 18, 1972

References 

Moscow Conservatory alumni
1930 births
2006 deaths
Azerbaijani composers